De Astronomica, or the Astronomy, also known as Poeticon Astronomicon, is a book of stories whose text is attributed to "Hyginus", though the true authorship is disputed.  During the Renaissance, the work was attributed to the Roman historian Gaius Julius Hyginus who lived during the 1st century BC. However, the fact that the book lists most of the constellations north of the ecliptic in the same order as Ptolemy's Almagest (written in the 2nd century) has led many to believe that a more recent Hyginus or Pseudo-Hyginus created the text.

The text describes 47 of the 48 Ptolemaic constellations, centering primarily on the Greek and Roman mythology surrounding the constellations, though there is some discussion of the relative positions of stars.  The first known printing was in 1475, attributed to "Ferrara."

The De Astronomica was not formally published until 1482, by Erhard Ratdolt in Venice.  This edition carried the full title Clarissimi Viri Hyginii Poeticon Astronomicon Opus Vtilissimum. Ratdolt commissioned a series of woodcuts depicting the constellations to accompany Hyginus's text.  As with many other star atlases that would follow it, the positions of various stars are indicated overlaid on the image of each constellation.  However, the relative positions of the stars in the woodcuts bear little resemblance to the descriptions given by Hyginus in the text or the actual positions of the stars in the sky.

As a result of the inaccuracy of the depicted star positions and the fact that the constellations are not shown with any context, the De Astronomica is not particularly useful as a guide to the night sky. However, the illustrations commissioned by Ratdolt served as a template for future sky atlas renderings of the constellation figures. The text, by contrast, is an important source, and occasionally the only source, for some of the more obscure Greek myths.

References

Citations

Bibliography
 Condos, Theony, Star Myths of the Greeks and Romans: A Sourcebook, Containing The Constellations of Pseudo-Eratosthenes and the Poetic Astronomy of Hyginus (Grand Rapids [MI]: Phanes Press, 1997) .
 Hard, Robin (transl.), Eratosthenes and Hyginus: Constellation Myths, with Aratus's Phaenomena (Oxford: Oxford University Press, 2015) .

External links
High-resolution images of some pages from the Ratdolt edition
Theoi Project: Astronomica (translated by Mary Grant)

Greek mythology